Jason Forbes is a British actor and comedian.

Jason Forbes may also refer to:

Jason Forbes, character in Alias Mary Flynn
Jason Forbes, character in The Bill (series 23)